Bottom of the barrel may refer to:

Bottom of the barrel, an English idiom originally referring to dregs, now meaning anything of low quality
Bottoms of Barrels, a 2006 album by Tilly and the Wall
The former title of Chris and Ciara, an Irish radio show

See also
Barrel